The Burlington Breakwater Lights were originally established in 1857 to mark the ends of a low, detached, two piece breakwater  long which protects the Burlington, Vermont harbor from Lake Champlain.  The breakwater is on the National Register of Historic Places, but the lights, being replicas, are not. The two lights were replaced and rebuilt several times as fire and ice took their toll. In the middle of the 20th century, the wood towers were replaced by steel skeleton towers. The City of Burlington arranged for Federal funding for replicas of the original towers which were activated on September 12, 2003.

References

Lighthouses completed in 1857
Lighthouses in Vermont
Buildings and structures in Burlington, Vermont
1857 establishments in Vermont
Transportation buildings and structures in Chittenden County, Vermont